The Sacred Mushroom was a blues rock and psychedelic rock band from Cincinnati, Ohio, active from 1966-1969.  The band was led by guitarist and songwriter Larry Goshorn and his younger brother, vocalist Tim Goshorn. All members lived in a house in Cincinnati called "Mushroom House" that "sheltered a small tribe" to escape from "the rich-blundering-narrow-minded-owner-of-the-non-essential-producing-factory."

In 1967, the band recorded a debut 45rpm 7" single, "Break Away Girl" b/w "Yellow Fever," which was released in the same year by Nashville-based Minaret Records. The single received local and regional airplay. The band was focused on guitarist, singer and songwriter Larry Goshorn and his brother, vocalist Danny. They recorded one album in 1969 which included original material and the covers of T-Bone Walker's "Mean Old World" and Ray Davies' "I'm Not Like Everybody Else"."The Sacred Mushroom" LP was released in 1969 by NYC label Parallax records, the 'underground' subsidiary of Audio Fidelity Records.

The band dissolved in 1969. Both Larry and Danny Goshorn later joined the Cincinnati band Pure Prairie League with their other brother Tim Goshorn. The brothers were active in Pure Prairie League in various forms in the 1970s and 1980s before leaving to form The Goshorn Brothers Band.

Band members
	
 Larry Goshorn, lead guitar, backup vocals
 Danny Goshorn, lead vocals
 Joe Stewart, bass	
 Fred Fogwell, rhythm guitar
 Doug Hamilton, drums

Discography

Single
Break Away Girl b/w Yellow Fever (Larry Goshorn) 1967, Minaret Records MIN-131 Arranged by Ar-Jay, Produced by Finley Duncan

Album
The Sacred Mushroom May 1969, Parallax Records: P-4001

Side A:

 1. I Don't Like You (Goshorn-Hamilton) 2:50	 
 2. You Won't Be Sorry (Larry Goshorn) 2:15	 
 3. Catatonic Lover (Larry Goshorn) 3:00	 
 4. All Good Things Must Have An End (Larry Goshorn) 4:40	 
 5. I'm Not Like Everybody Else (Ray Davies) 
 
Side B

 1. I Take Care (Larry Goshorn) 4:57	 
 2. Mean Old World (T-Bone Walker) 4:38 
 3. Lifeline (Larry Goshorn) 6:34 
	
All Tracks "Electric Renaissance, BMI" except A5 (Noma, BMI) and B2 (unlisted), Additional Musicians: Rusty York, Harp "All Good Things...", Produced by Herman D. Gimbel and Don Litwin, Engineered by William Hamilton and Gene Lawson, Cover Design: Larry Goshorn, Cover Illustration: Rhea Atkins, Back Cover photograph: Stu Levy
	
Originally Released on vinyl, reel, and 8-track in the USA and Canada. Rereleased on Compact Disc by Eva Records in France (1983), Akarma on CD and vinyl in Italy (2002), and on vinyl in the USA by Shake-It Records (2013).

References

American blues rock musical groups
Musical groups from Cincinnati